Jo Durden-Smith (24 December 1941 – 10 May 2007) was a British documentary film maker. His work included The Doors Are Open, The Stones in the Park, Johnny Cash at St Quentin, and, later, television work Russian Godfathers on the Russian oligarchs.

His books included Who Killed George Jackson? (1976), about the death of imprisoned activist George Jackson.

Life
John "Jo" Anthony Durden-Smith was born in Pinner, Middlesex, to parents who were doctors (his father was a surgeon and his mother a radiologist). He was educated at Haileybury and at Merton College, Oxford, where he read Classics. He worked for World in Action, Granada TV's documentary team, where his rock films were made.

Subsequently, he lived in New York, and then Moscow. He was a columnist for The Moscow Times until 1997.

His younger brother was the actor Richard Durden and his half-brother was the broadcaster Neil Durden-Smith.

Books
Who Killed George Jackson? (1976)
Sex and the Brain (1983) with Diane DeSimone
Russia: a long-shot romance (1994)
Mafia (2002)
100 most infamous criminals (2003)
The Essence of Buddhism (2004)
Nostradamus and Other Prophets and Seers (2005)

See also
A Horse Called Nijinsky

Notes

External links
London Times obituary
Daily Telegraph obituary
BFI filmography

1941 births
2007 deaths
British documentary filmmakers
Alumni of Merton College, Oxford